Jeongseon Alpine Centre (정선 알파인 경기장) was an alpine skiing area in South Korea. It was located on the slopes of the mountain of Gariwangsan, in Bukpyeong-myeon in the county of Jeongseon.

Overview
Jeongseon was a venue for the Pyeongchang Winter Olympics, hosting the alpine speed events of Downhill, Super-G, and Combined. It  accommodated 6,000 spectators. The technical events of slalom and giant slalom were scheduled for Yongpyong Resort in the county of Pyeongchang.

The capacity of the venue was 6,500 (3,600 Seats / 2,900 Standing).

The vertical drop of  surpassed the minimum drop of  required by the International Ski Federation (FIS).

The venue Gariwang mountain is one of the most remote areas in South Korea.

The centre officially opened in 2016 on January 22, two weeks prior to its first events, men's World Cup speed  The downhill on February 6 was won by Kjetil Jansrud of Norway with a time of 1:41.38, and the super-G the next day was won by Carlo Janka of Switzerland.

The women tested the Olympic venue in 2017 with two World Cup speed events in early March. Both races had the same podium finishers with Sofia Goggia of Italy in first, Lindsey Vonn of the United States in second, and Ilka Štuhec of Slovenia in third.

Ecological Issues

Environmental groups raised concerns surrounding the deforestation from the slopes of Gariwang mountain to build the Jeongseon Alpine Centre. Officials claimed it is necessary as it is the only slope that could accommodate Olympic requirements and the forest was to be restored after the games were done. Environmental groups were skeptical as the forest includes old growth of ancient and rare species.

A nearby stream was diverted into a reservoir at the base of the ski runs. The reservoir supplied water used to create artificial snow for the ski runs.

Post-olympics

Jeongseon Alpine Centre was closed and facilities were partially dismantled.

The cable cars were reopened to the public in January 2023 for a two-year run, after which time complete dismantlement of facilities and restoration of the mountain is planned.

References

External links
PyeongChang 2018 – Jeongseon Alpine Centre
FIS-Ski.com – World Cup - Jeongseon (KOR)
Men's downhill - Jeongseon (KOR) - 6 February 2016
Jeongsan Gariwan Cable Car

Jeongseon County
Ski areas and resorts in South Korea
Venues of the 2018 Winter Olympics
Olympic alpine skiing venues
Sports venues in Gangwon Province, South Korea
Sports venues completed in 2016